Choki Gyeltshen is a Bhutanese politician who has been a member of the National Assembly of Bhutan, since October 2018.

Education 
He holds a Master's degree in Education from Acharya Nagarjuna University, India.

Political career 
Before joining politics, he has worked with Ministry of Education for 27 years.
 
Gyeltshen was elected to the National Assembly of Bhutan as a candidate of DPT from Maenbi Tsaenkhar constituency in 2018 Bhutanese National Assembly election. He received 2,941 votes and defeated Tshering Phuntsho, a candidate of Druk Nyamrup Tshogpa.

References 

1966 births
Living people
Bhutanese politicians
Druk Phuensum Tshogpa politicians
Bhutanese MNAs 2018–2023
People from Lhuntse District
Druk Phuensum Tshogpa MNAs